Tarlina is a genus of Australian large-clawed spiders that was first described by Raymond Robert Forster, Norman I. Platnick & Michael R. Gray in 1987.

Species
 it contains six species:
Tarlina daviesae Gray, 1987 – Australia (Queensland)
Tarlina milledgei Gray, 1987 – Australia (New South Wales)
Tarlina noorundi Gray, 1987 (type) – Australia (New South Wales)
Tarlina simipes Gray, 1987 – Australia (Queensland)
Tarlina smithersi Gray, 1987 – Australia (New South Wales)
Tarlina woodwardi (Forster, 1955) – Australia (Queensland)

References

Araneomorphae genera
Gradungulidae
Spiders of Australia
Taxa named by Raymond Robert Forster